Anika  is a female given name of Sanskrit, German, Arabic, Swedish, Dutch, Hebrew, and Māori origin and is also an alternative spelling of the name Annika or Anikha

Meanings 
The meaning of the name "Anika" is different in several languages, countries and cultures. It has more than one meaning available.

Sanskrit 
Anika means graceful, brilliant or sweet-faced. It is derived from the Sanskrit word , which literally means 'fearless', 'soldier', 'army' or 'face'. Anika also means splendour, edge or point. It is also one of the many names for Goddess Durga.

Scandinavian 
Anika means graceful and merciful. It is the Swedish pet form of the name Anna and it is similar to Anneke in the Netherlands.

African 
In African regions it means "sweetness of face".

Russian 
With Russian origins meaning "grace," Annika is sweet and spunky, and a beautiful sibling of the name Ann.

German 
Anika is a German variant of Anna. Anna is most likely a variant of a Hebrew name Hannah, meaning "gracious" or "favoured", because in the Bible she was a sincere and merciful woman. Ultimately the name lost its initial 'h'.

Hebrew 
Grace; favour, unique. It originates from the Hebrew name Hannah.

Latin 
Grace; favor

Arabic 
In Arabic, Anika (Arabic writing : أنيكا) means unique. It is a variant of Aniqa (Arabic writing : أنيقة) which means "neat, elegant, smart".

Hawaiian 
It is the Hawaiianization of Anita, which means graceful one.

People 
 Anika Apostalon (born 1995), Czech-American swimmer
 Anika Bozicevic (born 1972), Swedish footballer
 Anika Kolan (born 2006), American cricketer
 Anika Larsen (born 1973), American actress and singer
 Anika Moa (born 1980), New Zealand musician
 Anika Niederwieser (born 1992), Italian handballer
 Anika Omphroy, American politician elected to the Florida House of Representatives in 2018
 Anika Rodríguez (born 1997), American-born Mexican footballer
 Anika Noni Rose (born 1972), African-American singer and actress
 Anika Schwörer (born 2001), Swiss volleyball player
 Anika Taher, Miss Bangladesh 1994
 Anika Tiplady (born 1980), New Zealand former rugby union player
 Anika Wells (born 1985), Australian politician
 Anika Chawla  (born 2011), India, Sulonian

Fictional or mythical characters 
 Anika Calhoun, on the Fox TV series Empire
 Anika the Warrior, a knight errant character in Russian fairy tales

See also
 Anikha Surendran (born 2004), Indian actress
Annika 
Aneka
Aneeka
Anica
Anicka

References

Feminine given names